Paul Aron (born 4 February 2004) is an Estonian racing driver currently racing in the 2023 FIA Formula 3 Championship with Prema Racing. He previously competed in the Formula Regional European Championship for Prema in 2021 and 2022, in which he ended both series in third. Aron is part of the Mercedes Junior Team. He also won the rookie cup in the 2019 Italian F4 Championship and placed third in the regular standings.

Career

Karting 
Starting in Estonia at the age of 8, Aron climbed the karting ladder as he was soon racing all over Europe but mostly in Italy. Aron won the CIK-FIA Karting European Championship in 2018.

Lower formulae 
Aron raced in the 2019 ADAC Formula 4 Championship for Prema Powerteam, he finished seventh in the championship with two podiums both of which were wins in Austria and the Netherlands. Aron's more successful campaign in 2019 came in the Italian F4 Championship, also racing for Prema, he took eight podiums and two wins, one of which also coming at the Red Bull Ring, with the other achieved at Mugello. Aron finished the year in third behind Red Bull junior driver Dennis Hauger and Brazilian FDA-member Gianluca Petecof. Thanks to nine rookie victories Aron became the rookie champion.

Formula Renault Eurocup 
After testing with them in the post-season test at Paul Ricard in November 2019, Aron was signed to ART Grand Prix's new Formula Renault Eurocup outfit for the 2020 season. Despite scoring a second place at the Nürburgring, the Estonian was outscored by his more experienced teammates Grégoire Saucy and eventual champion Victor Martins and finished eleventh in the standings.

Formula Regional European Championship

2021 

In 2021 Aron moved back to Prema to partner David Vidales and Dino Beganovic in the Formula Regional European Championship. The Estonian's first podium came at the opening round at Imola, where he finished second in race 2, being beaten only by previous year's teammate Saucy. Aron was able to finish third at the following two rounds respectively, but would then go on a podium drought that lasted until the seventh round of the season, where he ended the first race at the Red Bull Ring in third place. After a round in which he finished fourth and twelfth in Valencia, Aron claimed his first pole position of the season at the Mugello Circuit.

2022 
Aron continued with Prema for the 2022 Formula Regional European Championship.

FIA Formula 3 Championship 
In November 2021, Aron partook in the post-season test with Prema Racing on Day 2 and Day 3.

At the end of September 2022, Aron again took part in the FIA Formula 3 post-season test with Prema, contesting on all three days. During the following month, the team confirmed that Aron had signed up to compete in the 2023 F3 season.

Formula One
In July 2019, the Mercedes Formula One team added Aron to their junior team.

Personal life
Aron's older brother is 2015 Italian F4 champion Ralf Aron, who currently is a team manager at Prema Powerteam.

Karting record

Karting career summary

Complete CIK-FIA Karting European Championship results 
(key) (Races in bold indicate pole position) (Races in italics indicate fastest lap)

Racing record

Racing career summary 

* Season still in progress.

Complete Italian F4 Championship results
(key) (Races in bold indicate pole position) (Races in italics indicate fastest lap)

Complete ADAC Formula 4 Championship results
(key) (Races in bold indicate pole position) (Races in italics indicate fastest lap)

Complete Formula Renault Eurocup results 
(key) (Races in bold indicate pole position) (Races in italics indicate fastest lap)

Complete Formula Regional European Championship results 
(key) (Races in bold indicate pole position) (Races in italics indicate fastest lap)

Complete Formula Regional Asian Championship results
(key) (Races in bold indicate pole position) (Races in italics indicate the fastest lap of top ten finishers)

Complete FIA Formula 3 Championship results 
(key) (Races in bold indicate pole position) (Races in italics indicate fastest lap)

References

External links
 

2004 births
Living people
Estonian racing drivers
ADAC Formula 4 drivers
Italian F4 Championship drivers
Formula Renault Eurocup drivers
Formula Regional Asian Championship drivers
Formula Regional European Championship drivers
Prema Powerteam drivers
ART Grand Prix drivers
Sportspeople from Tallinn
Karting World Championship drivers
Mercedes-AMG Motorsport drivers
FIA Formula 3 Championship drivers